Credit card debt results when a client of a credit card company purchases an item or service through the card system. Debt grows through the accrual of interest and penalties when the consumer fails to repay the company for the money they have spent.

The results of not paying this debt on time are that the company will charge a late payment penalty and report the late payment to credit rating agencies. Being late on a payment is sometimes referred to as being in "default". The late payment penalty itself increases the amount of the consumer's total debt.

Additionally, a customer may see their interest rate drastically increased as a result of missing multiple payments. The penalty APR rate varies from card to card and is usually disclosed in literature at the time of a credit card application and also as paper inserts in the envelope that contains a credit card directly shipped to a customer's residence.

Research shows that people with credit card debt are more likely to forgo needed medical care than others, and the likelihood of forgone medical care increases with the magnitude of credit card debt.

Statistics
Quarterly credit card debt in the United States since 1986 (in billions):

 Q3 2016:  $927.1
 Q3 2014:  $833.8
 Q4 2012:  $828.8
 Q4 2011:  $834.4
 Q1 2011:  $776.6
 Q4 2010:  $833.1
 Q4 2008:  $984.2
 Q4 2000:  $688.2
 Q4 1990:  $245.9
 Q3 1986:  $133.5

Credit card debt in Europe:
 United Kingdom (September 2020):   £59.2 billion 
 Sweden (December 2020):   63.0 billion kr (SEK)
 Germany (November 2020):   €7.7 billion 
 Netherlands (November 2020):   €1.0 billion

Credit card debt in Asia:
 Singapore (December 2020):   $10.3 billion (SGD)
 Taiwan (January 2021):   $105.5 billion (TWD)
 Hong Kong (September 2020):   $22.7 billion (HKD)

Credit card debt in other countries:
 South Africa (September 2020):  R 131.2 billion (ZAR)
 Mexico (March 2020):  $13.4 billion (MXN)
 New Zealand (November 2020):    $6.5 billion (NZD)
 Australia (2010):    $50 billion (AUD)

Declines in credit card debt are often misinterpreted because they fail to include information about charge-offs.  The possible causes for a decline in credit card debt are consumers paying down their debt, credit card companies writing charged-off debt off their books, or a combination of the two.  The inclusion of charged-off debt can therefore significantly impact debt trends and the characterization of a nation's financial health..  For example, the $10.3 billion decrease in outstanding credit card debt in Q3 2010 relative to the previous quarter might at first glance seem to be a significant consumer pay down.  However, considering that the Q3 credit card charge-off rate was $16.9 billion, consumers actually increased their overall debt by $6.6 billion during this quarter.

Consumers also commonly pay down a large portion of their credit card debt in the first fiscal quarter of the year as this tends to be the time when people receive holiday bonuses and tax refunds.  However, credit card debt tends to increase throughout the rest of the year.

Credit card debt is said to be higher in industrialized countries. The average U.S. college graduate begins his or her post-college days with more than $2,000 in credit card debt. The median credit card debt in the U.S. is $3,000 and number of cards held is two.

Relieving credit card debt
Account holders can request a reduction in their annual percentage rate (APR). A survey conducted by the U.S. Public Interest Research Group in March 2002 found that among its fifty participants, including people of all credit backgrounds, who contacted their credit card issuers, 56 percent received a lower APR. On average the percentage went from 16 percent to 10.47 percent.

Due to the start of the Great Recession in December 2007, multiple credit card debt relief options became widely popular for consumers living in the U.S. with unsecured debt totaling over $5,000.

The various debt relief options available in the U.S. include:
 Debt settlement
 Debt consolidation
 Credit counseling
 Chapter 7 bankruptcy and Chapter 13 bankruptcy

Although each of these debt relief options deals with credit card debt specifically, they are also able to deal with other types of debt including personal loans, medical debt, accounts in collections and more (depending on the specific program type). Still, these programs have not been enough to help enough Americans get out of debt, resulting in a government call-to-action by economists for a massive debt bailout.

In addition, credit card issuers are now required to disclose to the consumer how much a balance will take to pay off if only the minimum payment is made on their billing statement.

Credit score effects

A debtor who pays their debts on time and most of the balance each month tend to have a positive effect on their credit. However, people who tend to carry a balance from month to month which is near their credit limit and does not pay down their balance can have a negative impact on credit scores. Credit utilization, number of on-time payments and how long you've had your credit card are among a few items that can effect the credit score of the person who owes credit card debt.

The overall score of a debtor varies from different scoring agencies and services which report to the bureaus.

Bankruptcy

A consumer has the right to dismiss certain types of debt under U.S. Chapter 7 and Chapter 13 but have to fulfill certain obligations to do so. A bankruptcy expert reviews the debt with the debtor prior to proceeding with these actions. In addition, certain kinds of debt reviewed may be considered fraud if it was discovered that a line of credit was used to make unusually large purchases or cash advances 60 days before the bankruptcy case was filed.

Political aspects
Some credit card companies have made lobbying efforts at the federal level in the United States to tighten its bankruptcy laws, making it harder to have credit card debts canceled.

Legal issues

Once a debt is handed over to a collection agency, they use measures to recover the unsecure debt that customers owe. Eventually if a debt collection agency is unable to collect on a debt despite measures to do so, they may use legal action in court to attempt recovery of such debt. A successful judgement against the debtor can include seizure and garnishment of assets including bank accounts and wages in order to pay off outstanding debts.

In addition consumers have rights under the U.S. Fair Debt Collection Practice Act which specifies that they can request in writing a debt collection agency stops calling them regarding a debt. This does not stop the collection process but may lead to a legal challenge if a no contact request is made.

If after the statute of limitations have passed in certain U.S. states and legal actions have not been issued against the debtor, a collection agency must legally remove the outstanding debt from their credit report. The process in the U.S. varies from state to state.

Forgiveness of credit card debt

A collection agency or credit card issuer may choose to forgive the entire debt completely relieving the debtor of the entire amount owed. However, in the U.S. this results in a tax form sent to the debtor which requires the debtor to file the 1099 C form along with their taxes. The amount reportable in the U.S. varies from state to state.

See also
Maxed Out – 2006 documentary about credit card debt and the national deficit.
Debt collection – A detailed process outlining the recovery of personal debt.

References

External links
 

Debt
Debt